The Home Mortgage Disclosure Act (or HMDA, pronounced ) is a United States federal law that requires certain financial institutions to provide mortgage data to the public.  Congress enacted HMDA in 1975.

Purposes
HMDA grew out of public concern over credit shortages in certain urban neighborhoods. Congress believed that some financial institutions had contributed to the decline of some geographic areas by their failure to provide adequate home financing to qualified applicants on reasonable terms and conditions. Thus, one purpose of HMDA and Regulation C is to provide the public with information that will help show whether financial institutions are serving the housing credit needs of the neighborhoods and communities in which they are located. A second purpose is to aid public officials in targeting public investments from the private sector to areas where they are needed. Finally, the FIRREA amendments of 1989 require the collection and 
disclosure of data about applicant and borrower characteristics to assist in identifying possible discriminatory lending patterns and enforcing antidiscrimination statutes.

As the name implies, HMDA is a disclosure law that relies upon public scrutiny for its effectiveness. It does not prohibit any specific activity of lenders, and it does not establish a quota system of mortgage loans to be made in any Metropolitan Statistical Area (MSA) or other geographic area as defined by the Office of Management and Budget.

Who reports HMDA data?
US financial institutions must report HMDA data to their regulator if they meet certain criteria, such as having assets above a specific threshold.  The criteria are different for depository and non-depository institutions and are available on the FFIEC website.  Additional information on institutional and transactional coverage for HMDA data collection years 2017 and onward can be found on the CFPB's regulation implementation page. The datasets containing information on HMDA reporters are the HMDA Panel and HMDA Transmittal Sheet.

In 2012, there were 7,400 institutions that reported a total of 18.7 million HMDA records.

Details of the law
Companies covered under HMDA are required to submit a Loan Application Register (LAR) to the FFIEC via the CFPB which acts as the HMDA processor. The LAR must contain the data outlined in the Filing Instruction Guide (FIG) for the relevant collection year for all covered applications or loans.

Collection of HMDA data 
For data from years prior to 2017 reporting institutions were required to submit their LARs by March 1 to the Federal Reserve Board on behalf of Federal Financial Institutions Examination Council (FFIEC), an interagency body empowered to administer HMDA. Pursuant to the Dodd–Frank Wall Street Reform and Consumer Protection Act, as of 2018 HMDA data was to be submitted to the Consumer Financial Protection Bureau via an online portal named the HMDA Platform.  The first year of data submitted via this process was 2017. 

The Dodd-Frank expanded the data fields collected under HMDA to provide better regulatory and public visibility into mortgage markets. Some changes include: 

 the option for applicants and borrowers to self report race and ethnicity information in disaggregated format.  The collection of race and ethnicity data requires a specific exemption from Regulation B, which implements the Equal Credit Opportunity Act (ECOA).
 other expanded demographic data
 expanded data on loan features and types
 use of Legal Entity Identifier (LEI) as a primary identifier for HMDA reporters
 use of Universal Loan Identifier (ULI), unless claiming partial exemption, that incorporates a check digit for accuracy
 changes in units of measure or enumerations to previously collected fields

On behalf of the FFIEC, the CFPB maintains a HMDA compliance guide that is publicly available and contains information on how and what to report in the data collection. Additional tools are made available by the FFIEC to facilitate compliance with Regulation C.

The Economic Growth, Regulatory Relief and Consumer Protection Act allowed small banks to claim partial exemptions from reporting certain data fields if their Community Reinvestment Act ratings were not low and they were below certain counts for mortgage activity.

Data collected in the LAR 
Contents of the HMDA data collection for 2017 and prior:
The date of application
 The loan type (conventional loan, FHA loan, VA loan or a loan guaranteed by the Farmers Home Administration)
 The type of property involved (single-family, multifamily)
 The purpose of the loan (home purchase, home improvement, refinancing)
 Owner occupancy of the property (owner occupied or non-owner occupied)
 The loan amount
 Whether or not the application was a request for pre-approval
 The type of action taken (approved, denied, withdrawn, etc.)
 The date of action taken
 The location (state, county, MSA and census tract) of the property
 The ethnicity (Hispanic or non-Hispanic) of the borrower(s)
 The race of the borrower(s)
 The gender of the borrower(s)
 The gross annual income of the borrower(s)
 If the loan was subsequently sold in the secondary market, the type of entity that purchased it
 If the loan was denied, the reason why it was denied (this field is optional for entities not regulated by the Office of the Comptroller of the Currency)
 Rate Spread (Rate Spread is the difference between the APR of the loan and the APOR for the week in which the interest rate was locked)
 If the loan is or is not subject to the Home Ownership and Equity Protection Act of 1994
 Lien status of the loan (1st or 2nd lien)

New or changed contents of the HMDA data collection for 2018 and onward:
 Credit score;
 NMLS Identification of the loan originator;
 Application channel;
 Applicant or co-applicant age;
 Combined loan-to-value (CLTV) ratio;
 Borrower's debt-to-income (DTI) ratio;
 Borrower-paid origination charges;
 Points and fees;
 Discount points;
 Lender credits;
 Loan term;
 Prepayment penalties;
 Non-amortizing loan features;
 Interest rate; and
 Rate spread for all loans.

Publication of HMDA data and related products 
HMDA data products are hosted on behalf of the FFIEC by the Federal Reserve Board for data HMDA collections for 2016 and prior and the CFPB for HMDA collections 2017 and later. Additionally, historic files prior to 2014 can be found at the National Archives and Records Administration (NARA) website. The NARA files include both Final and Ultimate datasets. The Final datasets include one year of resubmissions and late submissions by HMDA reporters and the Ultimate files contain two years of late and resubmitted data. NARA files include the statistical aggregates collected prior to 1990, the transaction level data collected in 1990 and onward, and the Aggregate and Disclosure reports produced from those data. The Aggregate and Disclosure reports were modified in 2018 due to changes in Regulation C.

In order to determine what transaction level data would be made public in the 2018 and onward HMDA collections, the CFPB used a balancing test method that weighed public utility of the data against potential for consumer harm. The application of the balancing test resulted in some fields being redacted and others being modified in order to protect applicant and borrower privacy.

HMDA datasets are published annually and include the Loan Application Register (LAR), Transmittal Sheet (TS), and Panel. The LAR contains transaction level data that were covered by Regulation C during the collection year. The LAR is one of the few datasets that contains application data as well as originated mortgages which allows calculation of denial rates and must be accounted for when analyzing HMDA data. The Transmittal Sheet contains self reported information related to HMDA reporters. The Panel is a compilation of regulatory data related to an institution that is used to profile HMDA reporters by peer group, such as by asset size, or by depository status and provide identifiers that link to other datasets, such as the CRA and the National Information Center. Initial dataset publications are referred to as the Modified LAR and are available on 3/31 of each calendar year. Later in the year additional datasets are published including the Snapshot, a point in time copy of HMDA of all three annual HMDA datasets, and Dynamic, TS and LAR files that are updated weekly. 

The HMDA Data Browser was launched as an access tool for the 2018 and onward HMDA collections. The Data Browser allows filtering by geographic location, including State, MSA, and county, HMDA reporter, by LEI or name, and up to two additional data fields. The Data Browser also allows access via API.

HMDA Data Use in Fair Lending Analysis 
HMDA data can be used to identify indicators of potential mortgage discrimination, however HMDA does not contain sufficient data to make conclusive determinations regarding discrimination. It is important to understand that in all cases of possible discrimination, the basic regulatory inquiry revolves around whether a protected class of persons being denied a loan or offered different terms for reasons other than objectively acceptable characteristics (e.g. income, collateral).
 If an institution turns down a disproportionate percentage of applications by certain races (e.g. African Americans), ethnicities (e.g. Hispanics), or genders (typically women), then there is reason to suspect that the institution may be discriminating against these classes of borrowers by unfairly denying them credit. Such discrimination is illegal in the United States. Although well-documented during the period of local bank dominance in American history, the rise of mass financial institutions since the early 1990s has led to increasing investor scrutiny regarding profits, and hence a lower likelihood that a bank can afford to subsidize such outright discrimination by forgoing loan originations.  Yet several recent studies using HMDA data still detect racial and ethnic disparities in lending activity, even when factors such as income are accounted for statistically.
 If an institution has a disproportionately low percentage of applications by certain races (e.g. African Americans), ethnicities (e.g. Hispanics) or genders (typically women) then there is reason to suspect that the institution may be discriminating against these classes of borrowers by unfairly discouraging them from applying for mortgage loans. Such discrimination is illegal in the United States. However, there is tension in this arena between attempts by banks to attract high quality borrowers and the extent to which borrower quality corresponds with a protected status. This type of monitoring, however, has been particularly effective as reducing implicit or referral based discrimination, where a discriminatory body, e.g. a local sporting club who quietly favors an all-white membership, is relied upon to recommend applicants. Banks are now wary of entering such relationships, insofar as they expose the lender to the liability associated with the discriminatory behavior of the partner organization.
 If an institution has a disproportionately low percentage of applications from certain areas, compared to areas immediately surrounding the area in question, then there is reason to suspect that the institution is engaging in redlining. However, note that few banks are found to be in violation of redlining clauses, as many pricing or approval models that are deemed legally valid are driven by factors with the implicit effect of redlining geographic areas if these areas contain a disproportionate number of poorly qualified borrowers. Rather, redlining must be quite overt to draw attention (e.g. using zip codes as a lending criterion).
 If there is a disproportionate prevalence of high-interest loans to certain classes of borrowers (e.g., Hispanics or women), other attributes equal, then there is a reason to suspect that the institution is engaging in price based discrimination. This is the most active area of compliance monitoring with respect to HMDA data, since risk management policies at many financial institutions are quick to identify outright discrimination by lending officers (i.e. denials based on a protected category).

Simultaneously, this area is the rifest for contention with respect to discriminatory claims, since there are market driven reasons for charging a higher rate that may exhibit discriminatory patterns. For example, a loan officer may query applicants to see if they have applied and been approved for a loan at any other banks. The rate for those that can produce another institution's offer may then be adjusted accordingly to remain competitive. However, if a certain ethnic group is less likely to "shop around" for the best rate, then the mere application of this principle — which is otherwise non-discriminatory in intent — can produce discriminatory effects. Many disputes between lenders and regulators in the context of price discrimination relate to such scenarios. Again, the key litmus test is whether the objective characteristic being used to lower or raise the mortgage rate for a given group is substantive in its own right with respect to the risk or profitability of the potential loan, rather than mere a proxy for racial discrimination.

References

External links
 Home Mortgage Disclosure Act of 1975 (PDF/details) as amended in the GPO Statute Compilations collection
FFIEC about HMDA
Maps and charts from Consumer Financial Protection Bureau
Public Law 94-200, 94th Congress, S. 1281: An Act to extend the authority for the flexible regulation of interest rates on deposits and share accounts in depository institutions, to extend the National Commission on Electronic Fund Transfers, and to provide for home mortgage disclosure. [Home Mortgage Disclosure Act]

Mortgage industry of the United States
1975 in law
United States federal banking legislation
Anti-discrimination law in the United States
Mortgage legislation